Zhuhai Street Circuit was a  street circuit used in 1993–1995 in Zhuhai for motorsports events before the completion of the permanent Zhuhai International Circuit in 1996.

In 1993, only races run by the Hong Kong Automobile Association was held at the track. In 1994 and 1995, the BPR Global GT Series, Asian Formula 2000 and South East Asian Touring Cars Challenge were held at the circuit.

After completion of the Zhuhai International Circuit, the street circuit has been discontinued.

Facilities
All the pits, paddock, VIP suites, guest stand and race control are situated at the start/finish straight at Jiu Zhou City.

Circuit route
The circuit ran clockwise. The start/finish line is at Jing Shan Road, at the end of the straight it turns right at 120 degrees into Hai Bin Road, it follows the road until it reaches Ji Da Roadwhere it turns 90degrees right. Then it turns 90degrees left to Jing Yuan Road and then left again for Yuan Lin Road. There it turns right and rejoins Hai Bin Road.

It then turns right for Jiu Zhou Road, then another right for Jing Le Road. After that is another 90degrees left turn for Yuan Lin Road before another sharp right for Jing Shan Road. It follows Jing Shan Road and then a slight right turn back to Jiu Zhou Road and the finish line.

External links 
Zhuhai Street Circuit by e-Tracks
Zhuhai Street Circuit by Motorsport Magazine

Motorsport venues in Guangdong
Sport in Zhuhai
Sports venues in Guangdong
Defunct motorsport venues